St. Mark's Episcopal Church, also known as Bangor Parish, is a historic Episcopal church at 405-407 B Street in St. Albans, Kanawha County, West Virginia, USA. It was built in 1847, and is a one-story brick building in the Gothic Revival style. The church has a rectangular floor plan with a front vestibule and entrance through a central tower.

During the American Civil War, the building and surrounding property were occupied by Union forces. They burned the parsonage and damaged the interior of the church. After the war the building had to be closed for a period of time while only temporary repairs were made. The Federal government paid restitution for the damages in 1915, and the building was restored to good condition.

It was listed on the National Register of Historic Places in 1977.

References

19th-century Episcopal church buildings
American Civil War sites in West Virginia
Churches in Kanawha County, West Virginia
Episcopal churches in West Virginia
Gothic Revival church buildings in West Virginia
Kanawha County, West Virginia in the American Civil War
National Register of Historic Places in Kanawha County, West Virginia
Churches on the National Register of Historic Places in West Virginia
Churches completed in 1847
1847 establishments in Virginia
St. Albans, West Virginia